Jiří Raška (4 February 1941 – 20 January 2012) was a Czechoslovakian ski jumper. He is regarded as the most famous Czech ski jumper of the 20th century.

Early life 
He was born in Frenštát pod Radhoštěm in 1941. His father died of leukaemia when Jiří Raška was nine years old, leaving his mother to raise four children on her own. His interest in winter sports was not surprising. His cousin and uncle, both active jumpers, took him as their disciple. "We were saying that children in Frenštát are born with skis on their feet," Raška said in the interview for Czech newspaper Lidové noviny. Raška was however also active in other sports, like football, cycling and handball.

Introduction to ski jumping 
As a young jumper he got into coach Zdeněk Remsa's legendary group, the “Remsa Boys”. When military service on Šumava threatened Raška’s budding career, Remsa arranged his entrance into the military sports club Dukla Liberec. In 1964 he travelled to the Winter Olympic Games in Innsbruck as a substitute. There he watched Josef Matouš, who led after the first round and had an opportunity to become the second Czech individual Winter Olympic medalist, but ended up without a medal. Four years later, Raška was in a similar situation.

Career successes 
Thanks to the fourth place in the 1966 FIS Nordic World Ski Championships and a second place in the Four Hills Tournament, he travelled to the 1968 Winter Olympics in Grenoble as one of the favourites. Raška himself was hoping to take the fifth place and would not have been disappointed with the tenth place. Czech writer Ota Pavel described his first jump in the normal hill event: "It was a beautiful flight in the infinite silence, that took short human age. Painter and editor Ota Mašek nearly fainted, photographer Jarda Skála stopped photographing. Coach Remsa was washing his face with snow and squeaking Norwegian Wirkola stopped squeaking." Raška jumped 79 metres, which was less than Austrian Baldur Preiml, but thanks to better style he led after the first round. In the second jump he did not fare well, reaching only 72.5 meters, but he went on to victory. Jiří Raška became the first Czech winner in the Winter Olympics. He added the silver medal in the large hill event, beaten only by Vladimir Beloussov of the Soviet Union.

On 22 March 1969, he set two world records, both at the opening of Velikanka bratov Gorišek in Planica, Yugoslavia. First he tied at 156 metres (512 ft) and then on 164 metres (538 ft), which lasted one day only.

That year he managed to win six races in a row. At the 1970 FIS Nordic World Ski Championships in Vysoké Tatry, over a hundred thousand visitors came to see him jump. He finished second in the large hill event and eighth in the normal hill event.

Raška's other successes included a silver medal at the World Championships in the large hill in 1970, victory in the Four Hills Tournament the year after, bronze in the historically first Ski-flying World Championships, and fifth place in the 1972 Winter Olympics in Sapporo.

In 1974 he became a coach but continued with active jumping. "I decided to end immediately as the first junior beats me," he said to the Hospodářské noviny (Czech newspaper) . Thus he ended his competition career in 1976 after being defeated by František Novák.

Coaching career 
Between 1994 and 1996 he was together with Medal and later on Malec coach of the Czech representation. During the 1990s he was also a coach of the Czech junior representation  and vice-chair of the Czech Ski Union. In the Union’s poll he was elected as a Czech skier of the century. He died in 2012 in Nový Jičín.

Ski jumping world records

References

External links
 Profile on the site of Czech Olympic Committee 
 Archive interviews with Raška in v Grenoble 
 Profile on Sportovci.cz 
 

1941 births
2012 deaths
Czech male ski jumpers
Czechoslovak male ski jumpers
Ski jumpers at the 1968 Winter Olympics
Ski jumpers at the 1972 Winter Olympics
Olympic ski jumpers of Czechoslovakia
Olympic gold medalists for Czechoslovakia
Olympic silver medalists for Czechoslovakia
Sports world record setters
Olympic medalists in ski jumping
FIS Nordic World Ski Championships medalists in ski jumping
Medalists at the 1968 Winter Olympics
People from Frenštát pod Radhoštěm
Sportspeople from the Moravian-Silesian Region